Concepció Ferrer Casals (born 27 January 1938) is a Spanish philologist, teacher and politician, the Second Deputy Defender of the People of Spain since 2012.

Biography
With a licentiate in Romance Philology from the University of Barcelona, since the 1970s Concepció Ferrer has lived in Figueres, where she has been a professor of contemporary literature. In 1977 she joined the Democratic Union of Catalonia (UDC). In the municipal elections of 1979 she was elected councilor of the municipality of Figueres. Later, she obtained the Catalonian Parliament seat for the constituency of Girona when the first elections were held after the approval of the Statute of Catalan Autonomy, renewing her mandate in 1984, both times within the candidacy of Convergence and Union (CiU). From 1980 to 1984 she served as First Vice-President of the Catalan Parliament.

In the European elections of 1987 she was elected deputy of the European Parliament, a seat that she renewed in the successive electoral calls until 2004. At the European level, she was vice-president of the European People's Party and president of the Unión Femenina Democristiana Europea. In 2011 she was awarded the Creu de Sant Jordi.

Works
 El Parlament Europeu, motor de la construcció europea
 Nacionalisme i europeisme (1990)
 Reflexions europees (1994)
 La Utopia d'Europa (1994), 
 Petita Història d'Europa (1998), 
 Una veu a Europa (1999), 
 Torn de paraula (2004), 
 Petita Història dels Drets Humans (2010),

References

1938 births
Living people
20th-century Spanish educators
Spanish women educators
20th-century Spanish women writers
21st-century Spanish women writers
Philologists from Catalonia
Women politicians from Catalonia
Women writers from Catalonia
Writers from Catalonia
Democratic Union of Catalonia politicians
European People's Party MEPs
First Vice-Presidents of the Parliament of Catalonia
Second Vice-Presidents of the Parliament of Catalonia
MEPs for Spain 1986–1987
MEPs for Spain 1987–1989
MEPs for Spain 1989–1994
MEPs for Spain 1994–1999
MEPs for Spain 1999–2004
20th-century women MEPs for Spain
21st-century women MEPs for Spain
Ombudsmen in Spain
People from Ripollès
Spanish women essayists
University of Barcelona alumni
Women philologists
20th-century women educators